The Albanian Fascist Militia (MFSH) was an Albanian fascist paramilitary group formed in 1939, following the Italian invasion of Albania. As a wing of the Italian Blackshirts (MVSN), the militia initially consisted of Italian colonists in Albania but later Albanian volunteers were also enlisted and made the majority of the group until it was disbanded in 1943. It was headquartered in Tirana.

History
The Albanian Fascist Militia (MFSH) was formed by Decree no. 91, dated 18.9.1939 of the deputy general and was part of the National Security Volunteer Militia headed by Commander General Mussolini. The militia was tasked with maintaining internal order at the request of the prime minister.  Its recruitment was voluntary for all persons who met the requirements for membership within the Fascist Party.  The officers were appointed by the General Command of the Voluntary National Security Militia, following the proposal of the Commander of the Albanian Fascist Militia (MFSH), after the Secretary of the Fascist Party was consulted.  NCOs, graduates, black shirts were all appointed by the MFSH commander.

The MFSH consisted of one command, 4 legions and 10 cohorts. It was fully funded by the state.

The militia was disbanded in 1943 following the surrender of Italy in World War II.

References

Blackshirts
Collaboration with Fascist Italy
Fascism in Europe
Fascist organizations
Military wings of fascist parties
Military history of Albania during World War II
Military units and formations of Italy in World War II